Miša Molk (born 6 September 1954) is a Slovenian journalist and television personality. Her professional career has always been tied to the television business and RTV Slovenija.

Career 
Born in Vrhnika, Molk graduated from the Ljubljana Faculty of Social Sciences. She is well known in Slovenia as a television presenter, producer, editor and journalist. She is also connected to the Eurovision Song Contest and is a member of the Reference Group in the European Broadcasting Union.

1976–1989 
Writing for national newspapers and magazine RTV SLO
Youth Programme/weekly: presenter and author
Entertainment Programme: TV quiz about international history and culture
Eurovision Song Contest: commentator (1986, 1987 and 1989), Yugoslav spokesperson (1988)
Song festivals: presenter

1984–1989 
Student Center of Ljubljana University
Manager of activities of students' interests, art courses, literary meetings, public tribunes about students' life and problems, organizing sport events, etc.

1989–1996 
TV Slovenia
Producer and presenter in the Entertainment Department:

Criss-Cross talk show, running 15 years
It's true, very successful talk show about the intimate and emotional life of the celebrity guests
Eurovision Song Contest, commentator (1990-1992, 1996-2000), Slovene spokesperson (1993 and 1995)
Jazz and pop music festivals
Writing in newspaper the agony columns; advice about life problems
Co-producer of travel shows: about the culture, entertainment and tourism of a certain region.

1996–2004 
Producer and presenter of the talk show It's true (till June 2003)
Head of Entertainment and Sports at RTV SLO
Public Broadcaster

2004–2008 
Executive Project Manager
Ombudsman for viewers' and listeners' rights (May 2008)

Other activities 

Writing columns in national newspapers about men-women relations, prejudices, education, habits, politics etc.
Presenting and producing national events on and off screen
Anchor of interview programs on national television and magazines
Member of EBU (European Broadcasting Union) Reference Group / making rules and decisions about preparation of the Eurovision Song Contest
Member of EBU Format Group
Vice president of EBU TV Bureau Light Entertainment Experts Group / developing new  Entertainment formats and co productions
Member of Board of RTV SLO
Chairman of the jury awarding the annual biggest achievements on RTV SLO

Awards 
Viktor six times (awarded by the Stop magazine), Kristalni globus twice (awarded by Nedeljski dnevnik magazine), Zlati ekran twice (awarded by 7D-Monitor magazine).

Living people
1954 births
Slovenian journalists
Slovenian women journalists
Women television journalists
Television people from Ljubljana
People from Vrhnika
University of Ljubljana alumni